Shada'a District (مديرية شداء mudiriat shada') is a district of the Sa'dah Governorate, Yemen. As of 2003, the district had a population of 11,202 inhabitants.

References

Districts of Saada Governorate
Saada Governorate